Loudoun Square is a planned station in Cardiff on the Butetown branch line. It is included within the Wales & Borders franchise and will be part of the South Wales Metro.

The station was originally planned to be located next to Loudoun Square, opening by December 2023. In August 2022 it was announced that the station would be located further north, would comprise two platforms, and would now open in spring 2024. It would be served by tram-train vehicles.

Services

See also 

 South Wales Metro
 Proposed railway stations in Wales
 Transport in Cardiff

References

Proposed railway stations in Wales
Railway stations scheduled to open in 2024